Thishdbv acronym may refer to:

 BChD, Baccalaureus Chirurgiae Dental, otherwise known as BDS Bachelor of Dental Surgery. Other dental degrees are DDS Doctor of Dental Surgery, and DMD Doctor of Dental Medicine.
 BCHD, Beach Cities Health District, the government agency providing preventive health services to the residents of Hermosa Beach, Manhattan Beach, and Redondo Beach, California